This is a list of the world's longest bridges that are more than  in length sorted by their full length above land and water. The main span is the longest span without any ground support.

 Note: There is no standard way to measure the total length of a bridge. Some bridges are measured from the beginning of the entrance ramp to the end of the exit ramp. Some are measured from shoreline to shoreline. Yet others use the length of the total construction involved in building the bridge. Since there is no standard, no ranking of a bridge should be assumed because of its position in the list. Additionally, numbers are merely estimates and measures in U.S. customary units (feet) may be imprecise due to conversion rounding.

Completed

Under construction

See also

 List of spans
 List of longest arch bridge spans
 List of longest masonry arch bridge spans
 List of longest cantilever bridge spans
 List of longest cable-stayed bridge spans
 List of longest continuous truss bridge spans
 List of longest suspension bridge spans
 List of longest tunnels
 List of bridges

References

Longest
Lists of construction records
Bridges
Bridges
Bridges